Nazarena Romero (born 23 May 1994) is an Argentine professional boxer who has held the WBA interim female super bantamweight title since 2020.

Professional career
Romero made her professional debut on 20 January 2018, scoring a four-round unanimous decision (UD) victory against Paola Farfan in Catamarca, Argentina.

After compiling a record of 6–0 (3 KOs),  she defeated Marianela Ramírez via UD on 12 April 2019, capturing the vacant South American female bantamweight title at the Polideportivo Fray Mamerto Esquiú in Catamarca. Two judges scored the bout 98–92 and the third scored it 97–95.

Three fights later she faced Laura Griffa for the vacant FAB and South American female super bantamweight titles on 28 December 2019, at the Club Independiente in Zárate, Argentina. Romero emerged victorious, capturing the vacant titles via UD with the judges' scorecards reading 100–90, 99–91 and 98–92.

Her next fight was scheduled to take place on 20 March 2020, against Julieta Cardoza for the vacant WBA interim female super bantamweight title. However, the event was subsequently postponed due to the COVID-19 pandemic. The bout was eventually rescheduled for 5 December at the Club de Ajedrez in La Calera, Argentina. After Romero unleashed a barrage of punches in the second round, referee Gerardo Poggi stepped in to call a halt to the contest as Cardoza was on her way down to the canvas, awarding Romero her first world title via second-round technical knockout (TKO).

Professional boxing record

References

External links

Living people
1994 births
Argentine women boxers
Bantamweight boxers
Super-bantamweight boxers